The  is a collection of biographies of Japanese historical figures by Kikuchi Yōsai, first published from the late Edo period into the Meiji period. It consists of ten volumes and twenty books in total. Moving through time from antiquity through the Nanboku-chō period, it contains portraits and rough biographies in kanbun of 585 imperial family members, loyal retainers, and historical heroines. It was groundbreaking for its visualizations of Japanese historical figures and has been treasured as a bible for historical art since the rise in national consciousness of the Meiji period.

Creation 
According to a postscript by Yōsai's grandson Kikuchi Takeku, Yōsai began writing the series in 1818 and finished in 1868. Meanwhile, a foreword by the Confucian scholar Matsuda Nobuyuki noted that the manuscript had been completed, so it may be assumed that an initial draft was complete by that time. Additionally, the first edition of Volume 2, Book 4 was released in 1843, but after that publication stalled, perhaps for business reasons. The series was likely not released in complete form until the beginning of the Meiji Era in 1868. According to the introduction of the series, it seems that Yōsai had intended to create an additional volume of historical investigations.

The style of the work is based on the biographical portraits of Chinese artists such as Shangguan Zhou (上官周). However, some of his sketches held by the Tokyo National Museum show that he also used models to capture poses. In addition, a bibliography at the end of Volume 10 lists 264 different texts used for background research, including history books including the Kojiki and Nihon Shoki and literature including the Kokin Wakashū and The Tale of Genji. Additionally, the Tokyo National Museum possesses a version of the Zenken Kojitsu that includes sketches of the references used on each page, providing the sources for the costumes and possessions of the illustrated figures.

In 1850, a special copy of one book of the Zenken Kojitsu made its way, through the regent Takatsukasa Masamichi, to the eyes of Emperor Kōmei. Additionally, in 1868, a woodblock print copy of the complete series was presented to Emperor Meiji by Sanjō Sanetomi and Higashikuze Michitomi. However, it is important to note that this achievement is recorded only in documents associated with Yōsai himself, and has not been confirmable based on official documents.

Influence 
The Zenken Kojitsu had an immense impact on the art, especially historical art, of the Meiji period, in which it was used as an iconic reference and textbook on the systems and customs of old Japan. The historical researcher and painter  later recalled that "it wouldn't be an exaggeration to say that in those days, there wasn't even a single historical artist who didn't study the Zenken Kojitsu."

The ukiyo-e woodblock prints of the Meiji era also frequently borrowed from the Zenken Kojitsu. Tsukioka Yoshitoshi adopted some of its techniques as early as 1867 in his , and his later works continued to show its influence. Yoshitoshi, who once aspired to be Yōsai's disciple, transformed Yōsai's scrupulous style into more intense scenes through dynamic compositions and strong colors.

The influence of the Zenken Kojitsu even reached into the fields of sculpture and Western-style paintings.

The Zenken Kojitsu even made its mark on public education.

In the early 20th century, though, even this popular work became old-fashioned. Shikō Imamura, Yasuda Yukihiko, Maeda Seison, Kokei Kobayashi, and the other members of the next generation of Japanese historical art, the disciples of Yōsai's disciples, continued to produce works based on the Zenken Kojitsu while they studied. However, as their focus shifted away from historical accuracy and the investigation of customs and towards expressions of artistic individuality and beauty, they ceased to look back on the Zenken Kojitsu.

Notes

References 

Japanese books
History of art in Japan